is a Japanese ice hockey defenceman for the Nikkō Ice Bucks of the Asia League Ice Hockey. Ono debuted in Asia League with HC Nikkō Ice Bucks on 2005 and spent his first four season with the club.

In April 2009, Ono signed with Anyang Halla (Asia League) for a two-year deal. Ono becomes the third Japanese player in the club's history. Forwards Setaka Tetsuo (05-07’) and Sato Masakazu (07-08’) were the previous two Japanese natives, but Ono would be the first Japanese defenseman in team history.

After spending 2 years with Anyang Halla, where he won his first two championships, he returned to the Nikkō Ice Bucks for the 2011-2012 season.

Career statistics

References

1983 births
HL Anyang players
Japanese ice hockey defencemen
Living people
Nikkō Ice Bucks players
People from Tomakomai, Hokkaido
Sportspeople from Hokkaido